The Party Ain't Over is the thirtieth studio album by American singer Wanda Jackson, produced by Jack White, the lead vocalist of The White Stripes. The Party Ain't Over peaked at number 17 on Top Rock Albums.  The album also peaked at number 58 on Billboard Hot 200 album chart, at the time making Jackson the oldest female vocalist to have ever charted on it.  Billboard failed to place the album on its country LP chart although Jackson covered several country songs on this disc.

The album featured covers of songs by artists including Amy Winehouse, Kitty Wells, Eddie Cochran, Johnny Cash, Johnny Kidd & The Pirates and Bob Dylan.

Shakin' All Over was featured on the Bridesmaids soundtrack and played during the end credits of the film.

Track listing

Personnel
Wanda Jackson – Vocals, Yodels
Carl Broemel – Pedal Steel
Justin Carpenter – Trombone, Piano
Patrick Keeler – Drums
Joe Gillis – Organ, Piano, B3, Keyboards
Leif Shires – Trumpet
Craig Swift – Saxophone
Jack White – Guitar, Bass, Tambourine
Olivia Jean – Guitar, Percussion, Bass
Jack Lawrence – Bass, Fuzz Bass, Upright Bass 
Dominic Davis – Upright Bass, Mandolin
Jackson Smith – Guitar
Ashley Monroe – Background Vocals
Karen Elson – Background Vocals

References

2011 albums
Wanda Jackson albums
Albums produced by Jack White
Third Man Records albums